Tyttobrycon is a genus of characins native to the Amazon Basin in South America.

Species 
There are currently six recognized species:
 Tyttobrycon dorsimaculatus Géry, 1973
 Tyttobrycon hamatus Géry, 1973
 Tyttobrycon marajoara Marinho, Bastos & Menezes, 2013
Tyttobrycon shibattai 
 Tyttobrycon spinosus Géry, 1973
 Tyttobrycon xeruini Géry, 1973

References

Characidae
Fish of South America
Taxa named by Jacques Géry